The Frons is the front part of the head capsule in many insects.

Frons may also refer to:

 Latin for forehead
 Brian Frons (born 1956), American television executive and former president of ABC Daytime
 Marc Frons, former chief technology officer of News Corp

See also 
 Scaenae frons, the permanent architectural background of a Roman theatre stage
 Fron (disambiguation)